Polyortha clarkeana is a species of moth of the family Tortricidae. It is found in Argentina.

References

Moths described in 1984
Polyortha
Moths of South America
Taxa named by Józef Razowski